This is a list of rivers in Niger. This list is arranged by drainage basin, with respective tributaries indented under each larger stream's name.

Gulf of Guinea
Niger River
Sokoto River (Nigeria)
Rima River (Nigeria)
Goulbi de Maradi River
Mékrou River
Dallol Maouri
Dallol Bosso
Vallée de l'Azaouak
Vallée de l'Ahzar
Oued Ti-n-Amzi
Tapoa River
Goroubi River
Sirba River
Dargol River
Béli River (Gorouol River)

Lake Chad
Yobe River
Dilia River

References

Prentice-Hall, Inc., American World Atlas 1985
 GEOnet Names Server

Niger
Rivers